Edmond Marmaduke Fortune (born November 23, 1932) was an American politician in the state of Florida.

Fortune was born in Milton, Florida. He attended Howard College and is a pharmacist. He served in the Florida House of Representatives from 1966 to November 7, 1978, as a Democrat, representing the Okaloosa-Santa Rosa district, 4th, and 5th district at the conclusion of his service.

References

Living people
1932 births
Democratic Party members of the Florida House of Representatives
People from Milton, Florida
Howard College alumni
American pharmacists